Ipsa childreni is a species of small or medium-sized sea snail, a cowry, a marine gastropod mollusk in the family Cypraeidae, the cowries.

Shell description 
Two views of a shell of Ipsa childreni:

References

Cypraeidae
Gastropods described in 1825
Taxa named by John Edward Gray